The 1996–97 season was the second in the history of Canberra Cosmos. It was also the second season in the National Soccer League. In addition to the domestic league, they also participated in the NSL Cup. Canberra Cosmos finished 14th in their National Soccer League season, and were eliminated in the NSL Cup Round of 16 by Melbourne Knights.

Players

Competitions

Overview

National Soccer League

League table

Results by round

Matches

NSL Cup

Statistics

Appearances and goals
Players with no appearances not included in the list.

Clean sheets

References

Canberra Cosmos FC seasons